In geometry, the grand 120-cell or grand polydodecahedron is a regular star 4-polytope with Schläfli symbol {5,3,5/2}. It is one of 10 regular Schläfli-Hess polytopes.

It is one of four regular star 4-polytopes discovered by Ludwig Schläfli. It is named by John Horton Conway, extending the naming system by Arthur Cayley for the Kepler-Poinsot solids.

Related polytopes
It has the same edge arrangement as the 600-cell, icosahedral 120-cell and the same face arrangement as the great 120-cell.

See also
List of regular polytopes
Convex regular 4-polytope
Kepler-Poinsot solids - regular star polyhedron
Star polygon - regular star polygons

References
Edmund Hess, (1883) Einleitung in die Lehre von der Kugelteilung mit besonderer Berücksichtigung ihrer Anwendung auf die Theorie der Gleichflächigen und der gleicheckigen Polyeder .
H. S. M. Coxeter, Regular Polytopes, 3rd. ed., Dover Publications, 1973. .
John H. Conway, Heidi Burgiel, Chaim Goodman-Strass, The Symmetries of Things 2008,  (Chapter 26, Regular Star-polytopes, pp. 404–408)

External links
Regular polychora 
Discussion on names
Reguläre Polytope
The Regular Star Polychora

4-polytopes